Shivute is the surname of:

 Eliphas Shivute (born 1979), Namibian retired footballer
 Peter Shivute (born 1963), Namibian judge
 Sackey Shivute (born 1965), Namibian boxer